Gustavo Cuervo Rubio (6 December 1890 – 3 April 1978) , he was a Cuban doctor and politician.

Government service
Dr. Cuervo was Vice President of Cuba from 1940–1944. He was an unsuccessful candidate for vice president in the election of 1936. He was the Foreign Minister of Cuba during the presidency of Ramón Grau in 1944–1948. He was a signatory of Cuba's 1940 Constitution.

Personal life
He was married to Conchita Fernandez.

They had one child: Gustavo Cuervo (Rubio) Jr. 
He is the Grandfather of Gustavo Cuervo Rubio 3rd.

References

  (Spanish)
 Anuario Social de la Habana 1939; Luz-Hilo S.A.
 Directorio Social de la Habana 1948; P. Fernandez y Cia, S. en C.
 Libro de Oro de la Sociedad Habanera 1949; Editorial Lex
 Libro de Oro de la Sociedad Habanera 1950; Editorial Lex
 Registro Social de la Habana 1958; Molina y Cia, S.A.

Vice presidents of Cuba
Foreign ministers of Cuba
1890 births
1978 deaths
1940s in Cuba
Cuban physicians
20th-century Cuban politicians
20th-century physicians